Forni di Sopra is a town and comune in the province of Udine, in the Dolomite Alps mountain range in northeastern Italy.   It is located at the top of the Tagliamento river valley.  Languages spoken include Fornes and standard Italian.

For di Sora is the third most visited settlement by tourists in Friuli-Venezia Giulia, and the most visited mountain settlement in the region.  The town is most visited by tourists during the summer and in skiing season.

History
The first historical references to the village date from 778 AD, though recent archaeological findings suggest that there was already a Carno-celtic settlement here roughly 2,500 years ago.  The University of Venice is planning to continue its archaeological studies here over the coming years.

Main sights
The main summer attraction is some 3,000 species of wild flora that thrive in the commune area. In addition, at one end of the village, the Parco Naturale delle Dolomiti Friulane (a nature reserve) begins.

There is also a second skiing plane on the southern side of the village, next to its sport complexes (swimming pool, summer tennis courts, and an outdoors ice skating rink).

Economy
Tourism is the major driving force of the local economy, with many tourists buying second homes in the region.  This creates demand for building work and service industry.  Less central to the economy, but still noteworthy is the spectacle manufacturing industry.  Many employed by this commute to the Veneto region (particularly the Cadore area) where many of the world's major spectacle manufacturers are based.

References